Norman Keith Breyfogle (February 27, 1960 – September 24, 2018) was an American artist, best known for his comic book art on DC Comics' Batman franchise from 1987 to 1995. During this time, he co-created the villains Ventriloquist and Ratcatcher with writers Alan Grant and John Wagner, and the characters Anarky, Jeremiah Arkham, Victor Zsasz, and Amygdala with Grant alone. He co-created with writers Gerard Jones and Len Strazewski the Malibu Comics Ultraverse flagship hero Prime, and both wrote and drew the Malibu-published series featuring his original character Metaphysique.

Early life
Norman Keith Breyfogle was born on February 27, 1960, in Iowa City, Iowa to parents Lois (née Roberts) and Gerald Breyfogle. He had a brother Kevin and a sister Penny Duncan.

Breyfogle began taking private art lessons at the age of twelve, and won an award at a local art show. His family subsequently moved to Houghton, Michigan, and the local newspaper The Daily Mining Gazette profiled him in 1976 as "Norm Breyfogle: Near Master Cartoonist at 16". While in high school, he produced Tech-Team, a comic commissioned by local Michigan Technological University. In 1977, he submitted a design for Robin's costume, which was published in Batman Family #13.

Breyfogle attended Northern Michigan University, studying painting and illustration while working as an illustrator for a local magazine and a graphics company. In 1980, he illustrated a book titled Bunyan: Lore’s Loggin’ Hero, published by Book Concern. He moved to California in 1982. He worked as a draftsman and later as a technical illustrator designing a Space Shuttle training manual for the United Space Boosters.

Career

Early comics work
In 1984, Breyfogle penciled a six–page story for DC Comics’ New Talent Showcase. Mike Friedrich (President of Star Reach, a talent representative agency) saw Breyfogle's work hanging at the 1985 San Diego Comic-Con Art Show and began representing him. This was followed by several issues of First Comics’ American Flagg, penciling a back-up story titled "Bob Violence" in 1985. During this time he drew for Tales of Terror, a horror anthology published by Eclipse Comics. Following that, Breyfogle wrote, illustrated, and lettered a Captain America story in Marvel Fanfare #29 (Nov. 1986). He then drew Whisper for First Comics in 1986–1987, his first monthly book, before landing on Detective Comics  starring Batman published by DC Comics.

Batman

Teamed with writer Alan Grant, Breyfogle worked on Detective Comics. They introduced the Ventriloquist in their first Batman story together and the Ratcatcher in their third. He drew the Batman for six years (1987–1993), penciling Detective Comics from 1987–1990, then moving to Batman to introduce the character Tim Drake as the new Robin from 1990–1992, and finally starting a new Batman series for DC titled Batman: Shadow of the Bat from 1992–1993 which saw the Grant/Breyfogle team create three new characters, Jeremiah Arkham, Mr. Zsasz, and Amygdala. During his six-year run on the Batman character, he drew a few one-shots, two of them being Batman: Holy Terror, the first DC comic book to feature the Elseworlds logo, and Batman: Birth of the Demon, which he hand painted. He provided pencils to a 10-page short story in Superman 80-Page Giant #1 (Feb. 1999).

Later work
In 2000, Breyfogle drew the Elseworlds three-issue mini-series Flashpoint. In 2001, DC offered him the job of penciling The Spectre monthly, which he drew for one year.

He spent 2003 penciling and inking the title Black Tide, published by Angel Gate Press.

In 2004, Breyfogle began work on an illustrated children's book for the Society of St. John Monastery, finished many commissions for fans, put together a couple printed sketchbooks showcasing his work, and continued writing his novel, getting halfway done, finishing through chapter six. He wrote over forty poems and over 1,300 haikus in a five-month marathon, and a number of short stories.

In February 2005 he accepted an offer to pencil and ink the interiors and covers of the new ongoing monthly title Of Bitter Souls from studio Relative Comics, originally published by Speakeasy Comics. It was written by Chuck Satterlee. Shortly before Speakeasy Comics went out of business, Relative Comics joined with Chimaera Studios and moved to publisher Markosia Comics. Breyfogle produced illustrations for a wide variety of clients outside of the comics industry including Nike, Inc., Mojo, The Red Bulletin, Time Out, Company, Süddeutsche Zeitung Magazin, and various bands such as 12 Stone Toddler, among many others.

In 2007, he provided art for the main story interiors and the covers for the comic book title The Danger's Dozen. He began a professional relationship with the London-based art agency Debut Art.

Starting in 2006, he began a working relationship with Mazz Press, contributing stand-alone illustrations to two novels by Stephen Pytak, The .40 Caliber Mousehunt and The Wild Damned.

In 2008, Breyfogle began drawing Archie's New Look, for Archie's Double Digest, published by Archie Publications. Breyfogle drew two titles for Archie Comics: Archie Loves Betty and Archie Loves Veronica.

He returned to DC to draw DC Retroactive: Batman – The '90s, written by his former Batman collaborator Alan Grant, in October 2011. Breyfogle contributed art to DC's Batman Beyond Unlimited digital comic series from 2012–2013; later reprinted as an 18 issue series.

In 2015, DC published Legends of the Dark Knight: Norm Breyfogle Vol. 1, a hardcover collection of Breyfogle's early Batman stories. A second volume was released in late 2018.

Retirement and death
On December 18, 2014, Breyfogle suffered a stroke that cut off blood flow to part of his brain, causing paralysis on his left side. He was left-handed, and although he regained some use of his left side, he was no longer able to draw professionally.

In July 2015 writer/novelist Glenn Hauman and writer/editor Bob Greenberger set up an Indiegogo campaign to raise $10,000 to defray the cost of Breyfogle's therapy, which involved producing a 280-page trade paperback reprinting issues #3–11 of Whisper, a 1986 First Comics series created by Steven Grant, which Breyfogle illustrated. The book also featured original contributions by participating creators, and was issued in hardcover to those donating at least $100.

Breyfogle died of heart failure on September 24, 2018, in Houghton, Michigan.

Bibliography

DC Comics

 Anarky #1–4 (1997)
 Anarky, vol. 2, #1–8 (1999)
 Aquaman Secret Files and Origins 2003 #1 (2003)
 Batman #455–466, 470–476, 492–493, 556, Annual #11–12 (1990–1998)
 Batman Beyond Unlimited #1–13, 15 (2012–2013)
 Batman: Birth of the Demon HC (1993)
 Batman: Brotherhood of the Bat #1 (1995)
 Batman: Dreamland #1 (2000)
 Batman: Holy Terror #1 (1991)
 Batman: Shadow of the Bat #1–5, 13, 50, 65–67, 75 (1992–1998)
 Batman: The Abduction #1 (1998)
 Catwoman #45 (1997)
 DC Comics Presents: Green Lantern #1 (2004)
 DC One Million 80-Page Giant #1 (1999)
 DC Retroactive: Batman – The '90s #1 (2011)
 DCU Heroes Secret Files #1 (1999)
 Detective Comics #579, 582–594, 601–621, 627, 659 (1987–1993)
 Detention Comics #1 (1996)
 The Flash 80-Page Giant #2 (1999)
 Flashpoint #1–3 (1999–2000)
 Green Lantern: Circle of Fire #1 (2000)
 Human Defense Corps #6 (2003)
 JLA: Incarnations #5 (2001)
 Legion of Super-Heroes vol. 3 #24 (1986)
 Lobo #51 (1998)
 New Talent Showcase #11, 13 (1984–1985)
 Silver Age Secret Files #1 (2000)
 Sins of Youth Secret Files #1 (2000)
 Spectre, vol. 4, #15–23, 25–27 (2002–2003)
 Superman, vol. 2, #130, #1,000,000 (1997–1998)
 Superman 80-Page Giant #1 (1999)
 Superman Forever #1 (1998)
 Supermen of America #1 (1999)
 Talent Showcase #18 (1985)
 Trinity of Sin: The Phantom Stranger #18–20 (2014)
 Wonder Woman Annual #5 (1996)

Eclipse Comics
 Tales of Terror #6, 8 (1986)

First Comics
 American Flagg! #33, 35–38 (1986–1987)
 Whisper #3–11 (1986–1988)

Malibu Comics
 Firearm #5 (1994)
 Hardcase #1 (1993)
 Prime #1–12 (1993–1994)
 Prime: Gross and Disgusting #1 (1994)

Marvel Comics

 The Avengers Annual 2000 #1 (2000)
 Black Panther, vol. 3, #30 (2001)
 Hellcat #1–3 (2000)
 Marc Spector: Moon Knight, vol. 3, #42 (1992)
 Marvel Fanfare #29 (Captain America); #37 (Fantastic Four) (1986–1988)
 Open Space #3 (1990)
 Prime vol, 2 #9–10 (1996)
 Prime/Captain America #1 (1996)
 Thunderbolts 2000 #1 (2000)
 Within Our Reach #1 (1992)

Now
 The Terminator #7 (cover) (1989)

Valiant Comics
 Bloodshot #30–31, 34–35 (1995)

References

External links
 
 Norm Breyfogle at Mike's Amazing World of Comics

1960 births
2018 deaths
20th-century American artists
21st-century American artists
American comics artists
American comics writers
DC Comics people
Marvel Comics people
Northern Michigan University alumni
Writers from Iowa City, Iowa